Izabela Prudzienica (born 27 May 1985) is a Polish handball player for Energa AZS Koszalin and the Polish national team.

References

1985 births
Living people
Polish female handball players
People from Jelenia Góra
21st-century Polish women